Grandes Éxitos 1991–2004 is the first greatest hits album from Spanish singer-songwriter Alejandro Sanz. The album assembles his previous hits in two CDs; the first contains songs from 1991 to 1996 of the albums Viviendo Deprisa, Si Tú Me Miras, Básico and 3 and the second the hits from 1997 to 2004 of the albums Más, El Alma al Aire, MTV Unplugged and No Es lo Mismo. For this album, Sanz recorded two new songs, the single "Tú No Tienes Alma" and "Cuando Sea Espacio".

This album comes in two editions; the first, called "Jewel Box", contains the two CDs mentioned above, and a second edition, called "Digipack", with an extra CD that includes demos, duets and material previously unreleased. From this selection of 14 rarities, stands out the demo of "Corazón Partío" to guitar and voice, recorded as it was conceived by Sanz before starting the recording of the album Más.

Complementing the release of the album, the DVD Los Videos 1991–2004 was released, which includes all Alejandro Sanz's music videos up-to-date with additional content.

Track listing

CD 1 1991–1996
 Mi Soledad y Yo – 4:57
 Tú No Tienes Alma (previously unreleased) – 3:59
 La Fuerza del Corazón – 5:05
 ¿Lo Ves? (Piano y Voz) – 3:35
 Quiero Morir en Tu Veneno (D'Romy Ledo, Adolfo Rubio, Alejandro Sanz) – 4:02
 Tu Letra Podré Acariciar (Básico) – 3:32
 Si Tú Me Miras – 4:14
 Mi Primera Canción – 4:36
 Como Te Echo de Menos – 4:00
 Pisando Fuerte – 4:28
 Viviendo Deprisa – 3:17
 Lo Que Fui es lo Que Soy – 4:40
 Los Dos Cogidos de la Mano – 5:02
 Se le Apagó la Luz – 4:46

CD 2 1997–2004
 Y, ¿Si Fuera Ella? – 5:22
 Corazón Partío – 5:46
 Amiga Mía – 4:48
 Aquello Que Me Diste – 4:46
 Cuando Nadie Me Ve – 5:07
 El Alma al Aire – 5:58
 Quisiera Ser – 5:30
 Hay Un Universo de Pequeñas Cosas – 5:22
 Y Sólo Se Me Ocurre Amarte – 4:35
 Aprendiz – 5:02
 No es lo Mismo – 6:04
 Regálame la Silla Donde Te Esperé – 4:50
 He Sido Tan Feliz Contigo – 3:52
 Try To Save Your Song – 3:41
 Cuando Sea Espacio (previously unreleased) – 2:11

CD 3 Rarezas ("Digipack" edition)
 Corazón Partío (demo) – 4:11
 Es Algo Personal (demo) – 4:09
 Cuando Nadie Me Ve (demo) – 5:00
 Hay Un Universo de Pequeñas Cosas (demo) – 5:29
 Seremos Libres (demo) – 4:45
 Dale al Aire (bulerías) con Juan Habichuela y Ketama (Antonio Carmona, Alejandro Sanz) – 3:46
 La Vida es Un Espejo (tangos) con Pepe de Lucía (Juan Manuel Cañizares, Pepe de Lucía) – 4:16
 Caí con Niña Pastori – 5:12
 Adoro con Armando Manzanero (Armando Manzanero) – 4:22
 The Hardest Day con The Corrs (Andrea Corr, Alejandro Sanz) – 4:41
 Eso con Omara Portuondo – 4:18
 Grande con Paolo Vallesi (Eric Buffat, Beppe Dati, Alejandro Sanz, Telonio, Paolo Vallesi) – 4:56
 Me Vestí de Silencio con Moncho (Pedro Azael) – 3:58
 Canción de Amor Para Olvidarte (Ryo Aska, Alejandro Sanz) – 5:15

Chart performance

Album

Singles

Awards

Album certifications

References

2004 greatest hits albums
Alejandro Sanz compilation albums